XAU may refer to:

 The ISO 4217 currency code for one troy ounce of gold
 A symbol for the Philadelphia Gold and Silver Index, an index of precious metal mining company stocks that are traded on the Philadelphia Stock Exchange
 An authentication protocol library for X Window System
 A Portuguese slang word, also written as Tchau or simply Chau, from the Italian word Ciao, meaning goodbye/bye